International Academy of Management and Economics or IAME is a private, non-sectarian, degree-granting educational institution in Makati, Philippines.

History

In 1979, IAME's precursor was established under the name International University Foundation. It was founded by lawyer and educator Emmanuel T. Santos, PhD.

In 1985, IAME was accredited as a local institution by the Commission on Higher Education (CHED) of the Philippines.

On March 21, 2003, IAME became the first Makati-based business school to fulfill the requirements of ISO 9001:2000 for establishing a Quality Management System for the Provision of Higher Education in Management, specifically for the design, delivery, and testing of business courses, and overall facilities management.

The first batch of graduates held ceremonies in Hotel Miramar in Hong Kong in 1982.

Academics

IAME provides undergraduate and graduate programs in management. Degrees/diplomas issued by IAME before 2012 have full CHED accreditation, CHED accreditation also covers students enrolled at the time of the CHED decision. Since then, IAME has been issuing degrees citing "accreditation" from World Education Services, a New York-based degree equivalency assessment firm.

Diploma in Management
International Bachelor of Business Administration / Business Management 
International Master of Business Administration / Technology Management / International Management
International Doctor of Philosophy in Management

Controversy

IAME has been involved in a dispute with CHED regarding the quality of its programs and its continued operations.

In February 2012, CHED ordered the closure of three IAME programs—Bachelor of Science in Business Administration (BSBA); Master in Business Administration (MBA) and Philosophy in Management (Ph.D. Management)--due to substandard quality. In July 2012, the Philippines Supreme Court upheld CHED's decision.

In August 2012, CHED cautioned prospective students from enrolling at IAME in connection to its closure order. IAME reportedly moved its operations to Hong Kong and released a statement stating that it is "beyond the jurisdiction of the Republic of the Philippines."

In May 2014, IAME stated that it has obtained a Temporary Restraining Order from a Makati Court against CHED's closure of the pertinent programs.

Management

IAME is owned and managed by its founder, chairman and chief executive officer, Dr. Emmanuel T. Santos.

Facilities

IAME is located in Makati with a business library, an IT resource center, a publishing house, an auditorium, a gym, executive conference suites, and a restaurant. IAME is housed in a four-storey mother building with a European Facade and a castle-like lobby and stairway.

External links
Commission on Higher Education: official Philippine government authority on higher education
www.iame.edu.ph – Official website
Current website

References

Business schools in the Philippines
Unaccredited institutions of higher learning